Indian Fort Road Site is an archaeological site located at Trumansburg in Tompkins County, New York.

It was listed on the National Register of Historic Places in 1983.

References

Geography of Tompkins County, New York
Archaeological sites on the National Register of Historic Places in New York (state)
National Register of Historic Places in Tompkins County, New York